Philip Filmore Isaac is the current Anglican Archdeacon of Tobago.

Isaac was born in Tobago and excelled at sport whilst at school. He worked in the aviation industry, tourism and radio before being ordained in 1994. He worked in St Patrick's Parish and then  St David's Parish in  Tobago before his appointment as Archdeacon. In 2007, he lobbied for Sir Elton John to be excluded from the Plymouth Jazz Festival, saying that "his visit to the island can open the country to be tempted towards pursuing [a gay] lifestyle."

References

Archdeacons of Tobago
People from Tobago
Living people
Trinidad and Tobago religious leaders
Year of birth missing (living people)